RuBot II is a Rubik's Cube solving robot developed by Irish roboticist and inventor Pete Redmond. RuBot II is also known as RuBot II, the Cubinator. RuBot II became the world's fastest Rubik's Cube-solving robot, and appeared as such in the Guinness Book of World Records. There are other Rubik's Cube robots too.

Pete Redmond has stated that although the robot was built for entertainment, the science behind it can be practically useful. The technology that helps the RuBot to see can also be used in other robots in places where it might not be safe to send people, like disaster zones, where a robot can be sent in to see and make independent decisions.

There are numerous YouTube videos of Rubot working on Rubik's Cubes, and its makers have given him some 'human' qualities, such as conversation to make these more entertaining.

RuBot Popularity

RuBot II, the Cubinator has been seen by tens of millions of people around the world on television and news shows, not to mention further millions of people reading about him in a wide variety of printed media from news to entertainment to tech, and popular science to trade press. RuBot appears at events and also headlines events. Over 3 million people have seen RuBot performing and entertaining LIVE in person. Rubot has entertained more people and events than any other Rubik’s Cube robot.

The Rubik’s Cube

The Rubik’s Cube is the most popular puzzle toy ever. It has sold over 450 million cubes. Everybody everywhere knows what it is, and how intelligence and concentration are needed to solve it. There are 43 quintillion possible configurations for the Rubik’s Cube (ie 43,252,003,274,489,854,000). A robot needs to be really clever too in order to solve it.

Record Entertainment

RuBot, II the Cubinator won a Guinness World Record for solving the Rubik’s Cube in the fastest time for a robot. As well as solving a Rubik’s Cube no matter how well an individual at an event may mix it up, RuBot engages and speaks with the audience. Millions of people have seen RuBot live.

Events

Some of the many conferences and events that RuBot has presented at around the world include Davos, Intel, Nike Inc, Google, BT, BBC, Rubik’s Cube official events and competitions, Hamleys Toy Store, European Commission, London Toy Fair, official events, and many more.

RuBot has appeared on numerous television and news shows from the U.S. to Europe to Asia, including for example BBC, Amazon, Sky, MTV, Discovery, Fuji Television, and many more.

Working
RuBot II, the Cubinator can easily pick up and solve the Rubik's Cube puzzle game in an interactive way. In a typical run, the robot is given a Rubik's Cube scrambled by a human. It then takes the cube and hoists it up to eye camera level, where it scans and records the configurations on all faces of the cube. The input configurations read by RuBot's cameras are run through Kociemba’s 2 phase algorithm to find a solution with less than 20 moves, the computation normally taking less than one second, and then works with it using its pneumatic arms. It can solve any Rubik's Cube in less than 50 seconds, and has managed it in a record time of 21 seconds. RuBot II has been nicknamed "The Cubinator" and "RuBot II, the Cubinator".

Creator
Pete Redmond is from Dublin, Ireland.  He has worked as an avionics engineer for the Irish Air Corps.  Pete has degrees in Computer Science, a master's degree in Engineering, and a Ph.D. from Trinity College. His other notable works include Diotoir and Nemesis from the BBC TV show Robot Wars, and RoboRiots.ie, and a combustion engine powered sprinting robot called Ulysses that set a world record on a BBC TV show called Technogames.

References

External links 
 RuBot II home page
 Rubik's Cube home page, Rubiks | Home

Humanoid robots
Rubik's Cube
2000s robots